Leptospermum novae-angliae is a species of shrub that is endemic to eastern Australia. It has elliptical leaves that are usually crowded, single white flowers on short shoots and fruit that remain on the plant until it dies. It usually grows in rocky places.

Description
Younger stems are silky-hairy at first, becoming glabrous later. The flowers are borne singly on the ends of side shoots that continue to grow after flowering. Flowering mainly occurs from October to November and the fruit is a variably-sized capsule  in diameter but often wider or narrower. The fruit remains on the plant until it dies, the sepal remnants having fallen.

Taxonomy and naming
Leptospermum novae-angliae was first formally described in 1989 by Joy Thompson in the journal Telopea, based on plant material collected in 1962 by Ernest Francis Constable on Bald Rock near Tenterfield. The specific epithet (novae-angliae) refers to the New England Tableland where the species occurs.

Distribution and habitat
This tea-tree grows in heath and forest in rocky places, especially on granite outcrops on the New England Tableland and nearby areas of the Western Slopes of New South Wales and south-eastern Queensland, north from Point Lookout.

Conservation status
This species is classified as of "least concern" under the Queensland Government Nature Conservation Act 1992.

References

novae-angliae
Myrtales of Australia
Flora of New South Wales
Flora of Queensland
Plants described in 1989
Taxa named by Joy Thompson